Prakash Yashwant Ambedkar (born 10 May 1954), popularly known as Balasaheb Ambedkar, is an Indian politician, writer and lawyer. He is the president of political party called Bharipa Bahujan Mahasangh. He is a three-time Member of Parliament (MP).He was a member of the 12th and 13th Lok Sabha of India and twice represented the Lok Sabha constituency of Akola, Maharashtra. He has served in both houses of the Indian Parliament.

Personal life
Prakash Ambedkar is the grandson of B. R. Ambedkar, and Ramabai. His father's name is Yashwant Ambedkar (Bhaiyasaheb) and mother's name is Meera. The Ambedkar family are followers of Buddhism. He has two younger brothers Bhimrao & Anandraj and a sister Ramabai who is married to Anand Teltumbde. Prakash Ambedkar is married to Anjali Maydeo and they have a son named Sujat.

Activities
Organized different mass rallies at national level after the Riddles march case, Rohith Vemula suicide case, Ambedkar Bhavan demolition case, Unna Dalit atrocity case and 2018 Bhima Koregaon violence case.

Prakash Ambedkar attracted controversy and criticism after he threatened the Times Now anchor Anand Narsimhan to physically harm the anchor by saying that he would think what he could do to him if the governance gets changed.

References

External links
 Parliament Biography
 75 Years of Poona Act

Living people
India MPs 1999–2004
Nominated members of the Rajya Sabha
1954 births
Bharipa Bahujan Mahasangh politicians
People from Akola district
Politicians from Mumbai
Lok Sabha members from Maharashtra
Indian Buddhists
20th-century Buddhists
21st-century Buddhists
Republican Party of India politicians
Prakash Yeshwant
Dalit politicians